Rosivé Silgado (born 30 June 1995) is a Colombian weightlifter. She is a four-time medalist at the Pan American Weightlifting Championships, including the gold medal in her event at the 2019 Pan American Weightlifting Championships. She won the bronze medal in the women's 59kg Clean & Jerk event at the 2021 World Weightlifting Championships held in Tashkent, Uzbekistan.

In 2019, she competed in the women's 59kg event at the Pan American Games held in Lima, Peru. In this competition she lifted 93kg in the Snatch event but failed to register a successful result in the Clean & Jerk.

References

External links 
 

Living people
1995 births
Place of birth missing (living people)
Colombian female weightlifters
Weightlifters at the 2019 Pan American Games
Pan American Games competitors for Colombia
Pan American Weightlifting Championships medalists
21st-century Colombian women